Yettel Hungary (formerly Telenor, Pannon and Pannon GSM) is the second largest mobile phone operator in Hungary. Yettel Hungary Ltd. was founded as Pannon GSM Telecommunications Ltd. in 1994.

History

In November, 1993 Pannon GSM Telecommunications Ltd. signed a concession agreement and in March of the following year started to operate on the 900 MHz frequency. In 1999 the company won a tender for the 1800 MHz frequency. In November, 2000 it started to operate on the 1800 MHz frequency in Budapest, and in March 2001, the whole country.

The network covers 99% of Hungary. The company has 13 switching centres, more than 1500 base stations and employs 1,060 people.
The company's revenue in 2001 was HUF 132.8 billion and profits before taxes were HUF 18.7 billion.

On January 31, 2003 the company had 2,627,000 subscribers representing 40% of the Hungarian mobile market, which was then shared by 3 companies.

On February 14, 2006 the company changed its main brand to Pannon and refreshed its visual image, in line with the new corporate identity of its parent, Telenor. On May 18, 2010 the company changed its name to Telenor.

In January 2018, the company's management confirmed media reports that there is interest in sale of Telenor's business in Southeast Europe, including Telenor Hungary. In March 2018, Telenor sold its business in Southeast Europe (Bulgaria, Hungary, Montenegro and Serbia) to the investment fund PPF, for a sum of 2.8 billion euros. 

In January 2022, Telenor announced they would change their name to Yettel on March 1, 2022.

Network information
The IMSI - Network Code of Yettel is 216-1 and MSISDN Network Codes are 20 (international: +36 20)

The display name of Yettel: Yettel HU

References

External links
Yettel Hungary
Yettel – PPF Group

1994 establishments in Hungary
Telecommunications companies of Hungary
Telecommunications companies established in 1994
2003 mergers and acquisitions
2018 mergers and acquisitions